Eric Tomlinson (born April 22, 1992) is an American football tight end for the National Football League (NFL). He played college football at UTEP. He previously played for the Philadelphia Eagles, Houston Texans,  New York Jets, New England Patriots, New York Giants, Oakland Raiders and Baltimore Ravens.

Early years
Tomlinson attended and played high school football at Klein High School.

College career
Tomlinson attended and played college football at UTEP, where he contributed from 2011–2014.

Collegiate statistics

Professional career
On December 11, 2014, it was announced that Tomlinson had accepted his invitation to appear on the NFLPA Collegiate Bowl, along with teammate Jameill Showers. On January 17, 2015, he played in the NFLPA Collegiate Bowl and was part of Mike Holmgren's American team that lost 17–0. Tomlinson was one of 19 collegiate tight ends to attend the NFL Scouting Combine in Indianapolis, Indiana. He had a mediocre performance overall, finishing ninth among his position group in the 40-yard dash and tenth in the bench press. On April 9, 2015, Tomlinson attended UTEP's pro day and performed the majority of combine drills again. He was able to have a better showing than his day at the combine and lowered his times in the 40-yard dash (4.77s), 20-yard dash (4.82s), and 10-yard dash (1.73s). His unofficial time in the 40-yard dash would've been the third best time among all tight ends who participated at the combine. At the conclusion of the pre-draft process, Tomlinson was projected to be an undrafted free agent by NFL draft experts and scouts. He was ranked the 20th best tight end prospect in the draft by NFLDraftScout.com.

Philadelphia Eagles

After going undrafted in the 2015 NFL Draft, Tomlinson signed with the Philadelphia Eagles. He was released during final roster cuts on September 4, 2015.

Houston Texans
On September 6, 2015, Tomlinson was signed to the Houston Texans' practice squad where he spent his entire rookie season. He was released on September 3, 2016 as part of final roster cuts. The next day, he was signed to the Texans' practice squad.

New York Jets
Tomlinson was signed by the New York Jets off the Texans' practice squad on November 5, 2016.

On September 10, 2017, Tomlinson recorded his first official receiving statistics in the season opener. He had two receptions for 25 yards in the 21–12 loss to the Buffalo Bills.  On October 29, 2017, Tomlinson scored his first career touchdown on a 20-yard pass from Josh McCown in a game against the Atlanta Falcons.

In the 2018 season, Tomlinson played in 15 games with 12 starts, recording eight receptions for 72 yards before being placed on injured reserve on December 27, 2018.

On March 19, 2019, the Jets re-signed Tomlinson. He was released on August 31, 2019.

New York Giants 
On September 1, 2019, Tomlinson was claimed off waivers by the New York Giants. He was waived on September 24.

New England Patriots
On October 15, 2019, Tomlinson signed with the New England Patriots. In his debut game, he recorded one catch for one yard against his former team, the New York Jets. On October 29, 2019, Tomlinson was released by the Patriots.

Oakland Raiders
On December 11, 2019, Tomlinson was signed by the Oakland Raiders.

New York Giants (second stint)
On March 30, 2020, Tomlinson was signed by the New York Giants. He was released during final roster cuts on September 5, 2020, but was re-signed the next day. He was released on October 2, 2020, and re-signed to the practice squad the next day. He was promoted back to the active roster on October 6. He was waived on November 13, 2020.

Baltimore Ravens
On November 23, 2020, Tomlinson was signed to the Baltimore Ravens practice squad. He was elevated to the active roster on December 2, 2020, December 8, 2020, December 14, 2020, and December 19, 2020 for the team's weeks 12, 13, 14, and 15 games against the Pittsburgh Steelers, Dallas Cowboys, Cleveland Browns, and Jacksonville Jaguars, and reverted to the practice squad after each game. He was promoted to the active roster on December 22, 2020. On February 10, 2021, Tomlinson signed a one-year contract extension with the Ravens. On August 31, 2021, Tomlinson was released, but re-signed the next day. He was released on November 1, 2021 and re-signed to the practice squad. On November 11, 2021, Tomlinson was promoted to the active roster.

Denver Broncos
On March 16, 2022, Tomlinson signed a one-year contract with the Denver Broncos.

References

External links

 New York Giants bio
 Philadelphia Eagles bio
 UTEP Miners bio 

1992 births
Living people
American football tight ends
Baltimore Ravens players
Denver Broncos players
Houston Texans players
New England Patriots players
New York Jets players
New York Giants players
Oakland Raiders players
People from Klein, Texas
Players of American football from Texas
Philadelphia Eagles players
Sportspeople from Harris County, Texas
UTEP Miners football players